Farrukhan (known in Greek sources as Pherochanes) was a 6th-century Iranian general active during the reign of the Sasanian King of Kings (shahanshah) Hormizd IV. In 590, he was sent to suppress the rebellion of Bahram Chobin, but was betrayed and killed by his own men.

References

Sources 
 
  
 

Generals of Hormizd IV
6th-century Iranian people
590 deaths
6th-century births